Bridges to Cross is an American drama television series that aired on CBS from April 24 until June 12, 1986.

Premise
Tracy Bridges works alongside her ex-husband for a magazine in Washington, D.C.

Cast
Suzanne Pleshette as Tracy Bridges
Nicolas Surovy as Peter Cross
Roddy McDowall as Norman Parks
Jose Ferrer as Morris Kane
Eva Gabor as Maria Talbot
Nancy Cartwright as Anita Jones

Episodes

References

External links
IMDb
TV.com
TV Guide

1986 American television series debuts
1986 American television series endings
1980s American drama television series
English-language television shows
CBS original programming
Television shows set in Washington, D.C.
Television series by Lorimar-Telepictures